KSHD may refer to:

 Shenandoah Valley Regional Airport (ICAO code KSHD)
 KSHD-LP, a low-power radio station (99.1 FM) licensed to Shady Cove, Oregon, United States